The Committee of Hong Kong and Kowloon Compatriots from All Circles for Struggle Against British Hong Kong Persecution, often shortened to the Anti-British Struggle Committee or the Struggle Committee, was a political committee established by pro-Chinese Communist Party activists during the 1967 Hong Kong riots. It opposed the British colonial administration in Hong Kong.

According to Ta Kung Pao reports on 24 May 1967, the committee consisted of 348 leftist activists and was chaired by Yeung Kwong, leader of the Federation of Trade Unions (FTU).

Members of the executive committee 

 Yeung Kwong
 Fei Yimin
 Xie Honghui
 Wong Kin-lap
 Wang Kuancheng
 Hu Jiu
 Huang Yanfang
 Wu Yi
 Liu Xian
 Guo Tianhai
 Deng Chuan
 Wong Fu-wing, Dick
 Pan Desheng
 Liu Yat-yuen
 Ren Yizhi
 Chen Hong
 Tong Ping-ta

See also 
 Pro-Beijing camp (Hong Kong)

References

Citations

Sources 

 

Politics of Hong Kong
1967 Hong Kong riots